Aegilia describens is a moth of the family Noctuidae first described by Francis Walker in 1858. It is found in Oriental tropics of India, Sri Lanka, to New Guinea, the Bismarck Islands and Queensland, also on Christmas Islands in the Indian Ocean.

The caterpillar has a medium grass-green body with a distinct, 'pulsating' dark greenish dorsal line. A brownish, faint, lateral line extending to the dorsolateral area. Spiracles are orange divided by black. Pupation occurs in soil within a silk cocoon. Host plant includes Mesua ferrea.

References

Moths of Asia
Moths described in 1858
Stictopterinae